Panas Karampampas is a social anthropologist at Panteion University of Social and Political Sciences, Athens, while in the past he has worked at the Università Ca’ Foscari, Venezia, at the University of Peloponnese, the University of Thessaly and at the École des hautes études en sciences sociales – EHESS, Paris. Previously he was a guest lecturer in the Department of Social Anthropology at the University of St. Andrews, where he also completed his PhD and a visiting scholar at the Faculty of Social Sciences of the National Research University - Higher School of Economics (HSE University), Moscow. Since 2018, he is a co-convenor of the EASA Mediterraneanist Network (MedNet), and since 2022 he is a co-convenor of the EASA Europeanist network. He was also nominated and elected as a Founding Board Member of the Association of Social Anthropologists of Greece.

Early life 

Before he became an anthropologist, he studied Physical Education and Sport Science at the National and Kapodistrian University of Athens (Greece), receiving his bachelor's degree. Then he completed an MA in Dance anthropology at Roehampton University, London. Returning to Greece, he worked as a Physical Education teacher and Ju Jitsu coach for some years. In 2012 he moved to Scotland, starting his PhD in Social Anthropology at St Andrews University. His doctoral research focused on the goth scene, digital anthropology, dance, cosmopolitanism and globalisation and completed in 2016.

Current work 
He currently works on Intangible Cultural Heritage policies and global governance. His work has been published in peer-reviewed journals such as Social Anthropology/Anthropologie Sociale, the International Journal of Heritage Studies and the Journal of Youth Studies. He has also co-edited the Collaborative Intimacies: Anthropologies of Sound and Movement (Berghahn, February 2017), while his edited volume Intangible Cultural Heritage in times of economic “crisis”: Marketisation and Resilience (The Hellenic Ministry of Culture and Sports Press) is in print.

Impact beyond academia 
The Council of Europe invited him to consult on Community involvement in a post-disaster heritage revitalisation focusing on creating a sense of belonging through Intangible Cultural Heritage for refugee and migrant populations. This was followed by Consultancies for UNESCO and the Greek Ministry of Culture. He was established as the first researcher on Intangible Cultural Heritage policies in Greece, examining the interconnection of policies between international organisations (UNESCO) and Greece.

Activity in sports and scuba diving 
In addition to his academic interests, he is a licensed coach in Kung Fu, Judo and Ju Jitsu. Moreover, he is an active (recreational and technical) Scuba Diving Instructor.

References

External links 
 Orcid link
 Academia.edu profile
 Google Scholar profile

Social anthropologists
Alumni of the University of St Andrews
Greek anthropologists
People from Athens
National and Kapodistrian University of Athens alumni
Year of birth missing (living people)
Living people